The white-throated toucanet or greyish-throated toucanet (Aulacorhynchus albivitta) is a near-passerine bird in the toucan family Ramphastidae. It is found in Colombia, Ecuador, and Venezuela.

Taxonomy and systematics

The white-throated toucanet was originally described in the genus Pteroglossus. What is now the white-throated toucanet was four of many subspecies of the then emerald toucanet (Aulacorhynchus prasinus sensu lato). In 2008 the International Ornithological Committee (IOC) split 10 of those subspecies to create seven new species, one of which is the white-throated toucanet, and retained four of them as subspecies of their current emerald toucanet sensu stricto. BirdLife International's Handbook of the Birds of the World (HBW) concurred. In 2016 the IOC merged two of the seven, the Santa Marta toucanet (A. lautus) and gray-throated toucanet (A. griseigularis), into the white-throated and again HBW concurred. However, the North and South American Classification Committees of the American Ornithological Society and the Clements taxonomy declined to follow them. In 2017 they did split the emerald toucanet into two species, the northern (A. prasinus) and southern (A. albivitta) emerald-toucanets, each with seven subspecies. They treat the IOC's "white-throated" as four subspecies of the southern emerald-toucanet.

Four subspecies of white-throated toucanet are recognized by the IOC and HBW:

 "Santa Marta" toucanet (A. a. lautus) - Bangs, 1898
 "Grey-throated" toucanet (A. a. griseigularis) - Chapman, 1915
 A. a. phaeolaemus - Gould, 1874
 The nominate A. a. albivitta - (Boissonneau, 1840)

Description

Like other toucans, the white-throated toucanet is brightly marked and has a large bill. The sexes are alike in appearance although the female generally is smaller and shorter-billed. Their bill is black with a wide yellow stripe along its culmen and a white vertical strip at its base. Subspecies A. a. albivitta and A. a. phaeolaemus have some chestnut or maroon at the base of the culmen. All four subspecies have plumage that is mainly green like that of other members of genus Aulacorhynchus, and is somewhat lighter below than above. The nominate A. a. albivitta has a white throat. It has bare yellow to orange skin around the dark eye that is further surrounded by blue feathers. Subspecies A. a. lautus has a pale gray throat and bare orange-brown or gray skin around the eye. A. a. phaeolaemus has a pale blue throat and A. a. griseigularis a gray throat. All subspecies have olive green legs and feet with dusky yellow soles.

Distribution and habitat

The four subspecies of white-throated toucanet are found thus:

A. a. lautus, Sierra Nevada de Santa Marta of northern Colombia 
A. a. griseigularis, the northern part of the Western Andes and the western slope of the Central Andes of Colombia 
A. a. phaeolaemus Colombia's Western Andes except the northernmost part
A. a. albivitta, the Andes of northwestern Venezuela, both slopes of Colombia's Eastern Andes and the eastern slope of the Central Andes, and the eastern Andes of northern and central Ecuador

The white-throated toucanet primarily inhabits the interior of humid montane forest but is also found in more open landscapes like the forest's edge, secondary forest, plantations, and clearings with scattered trees.

Behavior

Movement

The white-throated toucanet is non-migratory.

Social behavior

The white-throated toucanet is gregarious and frequently gathers in small groups.

Feeding

The white-throated toucanet forages by gleaning in the middle to upper levels of the forest, usually while perched. Its diet is eclectic and includes a wide variety of fruits, terrestrial invertebrates, and small vertebrate prey.

Breeding

Little is known about the white-throated toucanet's breeding biology. Its nesting season in Colombia and Venezuela is from January to September and in Ecuador from September to November. It nests in a tree cavity like others of its family.

Vocal and non-vocal sounds

The white-throated toucanet's vocalizations seem to vary across its range. Authors describe it as "a rapid ser[ies] of short took or churt notes" in Colombia, as "a guttural, grinding grá-val, grá-val, grá-val...varied to roouk, roouk, roouk" in Venezuela, and "a persistent and fast rek-rek-rek-rek or rr-rek, rr-rek, rr-rek" in Ecuador. In flight its wings make a whirring sound.

Status

The IUCN has assessed the white-throated toucanet as being of Least Concern. It has a large range, but its population size is not known and is believed to be decreasing. No immediate threats have been identified. It is "vulnerable to habitat destruction".

References

Aulacorhynchus
Birds described in 1840